FilmFreeway is a website for filmmakers to submit their films to hundreds of film festivals globally.  

It is the official sponsor of Orlando Film Festival, 2020.

Partners
Partial list of partners:

Academy of Motion Picture Arts and Sciences
Doc NYC
Raindance
Slamdance
Sundance

References

External links
 

Canadian film websites